Nemailal Roy (born 10 March 1941) is an Indian former cricketer. He played first-class cricket for Bengal and Jharkhand.

References

External links
 

1941 births
Living people
Indian cricketers
Bengal cricketers
Jharkhand cricketers
Cricketers from Kolkata